Van den Bos is a Dutch toponymic surname meaning "from the forest". 

 Alida van den Bos (1902–2003), Dutch gymnast
 Bob van den Bos (born 1947), Dutch politician
 Conny Vandenbos (1937–2002), Dutch pop singer
 Jasper van den Bos (1634–1656), Dutch painter
 Jip van den Bos (born 1996), Dutch racing cyclist
 Matthijs van den Bos (born 1969), Dutch scholar of Iranian Sufism and European Shi'ism
 Michiel van den Bos (born 1975), Dutch video game musician
 Paul van den Bos (born 1940), Dutch photographer and cinematographer
 Pieter Vanden Bos (born 1961), Canadian football offensive lineman
 Ricardo van den Bos (born 1984), Dutch kickboxer
 Willem Hendrik van den Bos (1886–1974), Dutch-South African astronomer

See also
1663 van den Bos, main belt asteroid named after the astronomer
Van den Bos (crater), small lunar crater named after the astronomer
Van den Bosch
Van den Bossche

Dutch-language surnames
Surnames of Dutch origin
Dutch toponymic surnames